Broadway Gold is a 1923 American silent drama film directed by Edward Dillon and starring Elaine Hammerstein, Elliott Dexter, and Kathlyn Williams.

The film's sets were designed by the art director Cedric Gibbons.

Cast

Preservation
A print of Broadway Gold has been recently located in a film archive, so it is currently not considered a lost film.

References

Bibliography
 Darby, William. Masters of Lens and Light: A Checklist of Major Cinematographers and Their Feature Films. Scarecrow Press, 1991.

External links

Lantern slide and still at silenthollywood.com

1923 films
1923 drama films
1920s English-language films
American silent feature films
Silent American drama films
Films directed by Edward Dillon
American black-and-white films
1920s American films